This article contains past rosters  of the Galatasaray S.K. (women's basketball) team.

1990 Era

1990/91

1991/92
Roster

1992/93
Roster

1993/94
Roster

1994/95
Roster

1995/96
Roster

1996/97
Roster

1997/98
Roster

1998/99
Roster

1999/00

2000 Era

2000/01
Roster

2001/02

2002/03

2003/04
Roster

2004/05
Roster

2005/06
Roster

2006/07
Roster

2007/08
Roster

2008/09
Roster

2009/10
Roster

2010 Era

2010/11
Roster

2011/12
Roster

2012/13
Roster

2013/14
Roster

2014/15
Roster

2015/16
Roster

2016/17
Roster

2017/18
Roster

2018/19
Roster

2019/20
Roster

2020 Era

2020/21
Roster

2021/22
Roster

See also
See also Galatasaray Men's Basketball Team past rosters
See also Galatasaray Wheelchair Basketball Team past rosters

References